Willie O'Dwyer (born 4 April 1984) is an Irish sportsperson from Mullinavat, County Kilkenny, Ireland.  He plays hurling with his local club Mullinavat and with the Kilkenny senior inter-county team from 2006 to 2009 and the Kerry intercounty team from 2012.

Playing career
O'Dwyer played in the U-21 All-Ireland against Tipperary in 2004 where he received the Man of the Match.  He is the Leading player for his club, Mullinavat, where he plays in the forwards.  He also played with Waterford IT in the Fitzgibbon Cup Colleges Hurling. In 2007 O'Dwyer also lined out for Dublin IT in the Fitzgibbon Cup. He won 3 Kilkenny Intermediate Hurling Championship with his club Mullinavat in 2001, 2006, 2014.

Kilkenny
He was part of the Kilkenny minor team in 2002 that won that year's All Ireland. He then moved on to the Under 21 team and won an All Ireland in 2004.

O'Dwyer was part of the Kilkenny senior hurling panel from 2003 to 2009. He came on as a sub when Kilkenny beat Cork won the 2006 All Ireland for the first time since 2003. He played in the corner forward position in the Leinster Senior Hurling final against Wexford in 2007, where he scored 2-03. He later played in the All Ireland final where Kilkenny overcame Limerick. He remain on the panel for the 2008 and 2009 All-Ireland wins.

Kerry

Having been living and working in Tralee for a number of year he joined up with John Meylers Kerry for the 2012 season. He played in all of Kerry's Div 2A League games as they missed out on the final. He then lined out in the Christy Ring Cup in the first round Kerry had a shock loss to Wicklow. In the losers rounds they had another shock loss this time to Kildare.

In 2013 he was again part of the Kerry side that just missed out on a place in the Div 2A final and promotion to Div 1B. After a disappointing 2012 Christy Ring Cup Kerry regrouped to make it to the final for the third time in four seasons but lost out to a last minute goal to Down.

Honours
5 All-Ireland Senior Hurling Medals
1 All-Ireland Minor Hurling Medal
2 Leinster Minor Hurling Medals
2 U21 All-Ireland Hurling Medal
3 U21 Leinster Hurling Medals
5 Leinster Senior Hurling Medals
3 National Hurling League Medals
2 Kilkenny Intermediate Club Championship Medals
1 Kilkenny Minor Club Championship Medal
2 Walsh Cup Senior Hurling Medals

References

Teams

1984 births
Living people
Mullinavat hurlers
Kilkenny inter-county hurlers
Kerry inter-county hurlers
All-Ireland Senior Hurling Championship winners